Jiuru Township is a rural township in Pingtung County, Taiwan.

Geography

Administrative divisions
The township comprises 11 villages: Daqiu, Houzhuang, Jiukuai, Jiuming, Jiuqing, Qiaxing, Qilao, Sankuai, Tungning, Yuquan and Yushui.

Transportation 

Kao-Ping Hsi Bridge

Tourist attractions
 Ligang Bridge
 Three Mountains King Temple

References

External links 

 Jiuru Township Office  
 

Townships in Pingtung County